Le Clos Arsène Lupin, Maison Maurice Leblanc is a museum dedicated to the fictional hero Arsène Lupin, created by the writer Maurice Leblanc.

The museum is located at 15, rue Guy-de-Maupassant in Étretat, in the former home of Maurice Leblanc. It opened to the public in June 1999, after the house was bought by Maurice Leblanc's granddaughter, Florence Boespflug-Leblanc. Le Clos Lupin houses photos, paintings, writings and other personal accessories, some of which are original, as well as clothing and other utensils from his fictional hero Arsène Lupin.

History

This Anglo-Norman half-timbered house was built around 1850. In 1918 writer Maurice Leblanc bought a historic villa in Étretat, which he wanted to use for living and working personally. Leblanc lived in this house for more than twenty years. It originally bore the name "The Sphinx", but Leblanc renamed it "Clos Lupin", in homage to Arsène Lupin, whom he conceived, and to the flowers, and to the Lupinus flower plants in the garden, which he had planted there.

The house was confiscated during the German occupation in World War II. Subsequently, it was sold by Leblanc's son in 1952. In 1998 Florence Boespflug, Maurice Leblanc's granddaughter, was able to buy back the “Clos Lupine” and established a museum with accessories from her grandfather and his most famous fictional character, Arsène Lupin, in this old villa. The museum opened in 1999 under its current name Le Clos Arsène Lupin, Maison Maurice Leblanc. From its opening in 1999 to 2004, it had more than 125,000 visitors.

In 2011, the property and the fund of the collection were bought for €639,000 by the Haute-Normandie Region (45%), the Department of Seine-Maritime (45%) and the municipality of Étretat (10%) which include  Clos Lupin in the Historic route of writers' houses. According to director Maryse Alix, in 2016, the Clos Lupin attracts 17,000 to 25,000 annual visitors, and that Clos Lupin is "the most visited writer's house in France.

Description
The museum building is a two-storey Anglo-Norman style villa from the 19th century. Parts of the ground floor and the first floor are used as museum rooms today. The tour takes place in the following seven stages:
 Le cabinet de travail de Maurice Leblanc (Maurice Leblanc's office)
 Le repaire d'un gentleman (A gentleman's lair)
 La chambre du Chiffre (The Cipher's room)
 La salle des 47 "Lupin" ("Lupin" Room 47)
 On touche au but! (We are reaching our goal!)
 Le secret de l'Aiguille (The Secret of the Needle)
 Lupin court toujours (Lupin always running)

During the guided tour of the museum in English or French, via an audio guide, the visitor learns numerous personal things about his life and work from the supposed voice of Maurice Leblanc. The stages are accompanied by a variety of visual special effects. In addition, the 'author' is haunted by his fictional character Arsène Lupin (in French, voiced by Georges Descrières, who portrayed him in the 1970s television series) during this audio-visual tour and an informative dialogue (radio play) develops between the two, in the course of which the museum visitor in particular learns the secret of the “L 'Aiguille creuse' (the Hollow needle). The museum building is located on a closed garden plot with old pine trees, lupins, statues, a historic fountain and a pergola overgrown with wisteria.

Arsène Lupin Prize
Created in 2006 at the instigation of the Association du Clos Arsène Lupin and Florence Boespflug-Leblanc, granddaughter of Maurice Leblanc, the Arsène Lupin Prize for Police Literature seeks to distinguish each year, a detective novel that combines the humor and detective mystery akin to Maurice Leblanc's Arsène Lupin stories. A €1,000 prize is awarded each year at a ceremony at Clos Lupin.

Gallery

References

Bibliography

External links
 
 Tourist office of the city of Étretat

 
Museums established in 1999
Museums in Normandy